is a Buddhist temple of the Shingon Ritsu sect in Nara, Japan. Its foundation is variously dated, but mention in a document in the Shōsōin provides a terminus ante quem of the mid-eighth century.

Name
Hannya is a phonetic rendering of prajñā, the Sanskrit term for wisdom or insight.

History
Emperor Shōmu is then said to have bestowed upon it, in 735, six hundred volumes of the Daihannyaharamitta-kyō, in gold on indigo paper, along with a sotōba and the name Hannya-ji.

According to The Tale of the Heike, during the Genpei War, Taira no Kiyomori dispatched Taira no Shigehira to lead the attack on Nara, in 1180. The defenders, many of them monks, took up position on Narazaka and at Hannya-ji. When the fighting continued into the night, Shigehira ordered torches to be lit, and one of his men set fire to a nearby house. Fanned by strong winds, the flames spread as far as Tōdai-ji and Kōfuku-ji. Later Shigehira's head was nailed in front of the Hannya-ji torii, since this is where he had stood when the temples burned.

Architecture

Rōmon
The rōmon or "tower gate" is a National Treasure. Dated to the second half of the thirteenth century, perhaps to the Bun'ei era, it is unusual in having only one entrance, its narrowness precluding the standard three; a three bay form is adopted in the upper level.

Hondō
The hondō with hip-and-gable roof dates from Kanbun 7 (1667) and has been designated a Prefectural Cultural Property.

Kyōzō
The three-by-two bay kyōzō or repository for sutras, temple chronicles, and the like, dates from the second half of the Kamakura period and is an Important Cultural Property.

Tō
The thirteen-storey stone pagoda dates from 1253 and is an Important Cultural Property.

Treasures
Important Cultural Properties include the hengaku or plaque bearing the temple's name, from the Heian period; a reliquary of the Kamakura period; a pair of kasatōba from 1261; a wooden Monju Bosatsu riding on a lion of 1324; a bronze Yakushi Nyorai of the Heian period; a prayer text by Eison of 1269; and a collection of objects from inside the stone tō, dating from the Nara period to the Meiji period as well as from Southern Song China, uncovered in 1964. There are also statues from the Edo period of Fudō Myōō, the Four Heavenly Kings, Kōbō Daishi, and Kōshō Daishi (Eison), as well as a series of thirteen stone images of Kannon.

Gallery

See also
List of National Treasures of Japan (temples)
 For an explanation of terms concerning Japanese Buddhism, Japanese Buddhist art, and Japanese Buddhist temple architecture, see the Glossary of Japanese Buddhism.

References

External links

  Hannya-ji

8th-century Buddhist temples
Buddhist temples in Nara, Nara
National Treasures of Japan